Air Commodore Robert Alfred Copsey Carter,  (15 September 1910 – 10 November 2012) was a senior Royal Air Force officer who served with RAF Bomber Command during the Second World War.

References

External links
 ‘CARTER, Air Cdre Robert Alfred Copsey’, Who's Who 2013,  A & C Black, an imprint of Bloomsbury Publishing plc, 2013; online edn, Oxford University Press, Dec 2012; online edn, Nov 2012, accessed 31 Jan 2013

1910 births
2012 deaths
British centenarians
British World War II bomber pilots
Companions of the Distinguished Service Order
Companions of the Order of the Bath
Men centenarians
Military personnel from Portsmouth
Recipients of the Distinguished Flying Cross (United Kingdom)
Royal Air Force air commodores
Royal Air Force pilots of World War II